Maninderjeet Singh Buttar is an Indian singer and songwriter known for his work in Punjabi music. He is best known for songs "Yaari", "Sakhiyaan", "Ik Tera", "Pani Di Gal"and "Laare".

Career
His song Sakhiyaan has gathered a total of over 489 million views on YouTube. In 2015, his song Yaari was nominated for "Most Popular Song" in PTC Punjabi Music Awards. In 2018, shortly after the release of Sakhiyaan, the song became the number one song on the Punjabi Most Popular charts compiled by Gaana, and remained there through November 2018, and at number two through December.  In 2014, Buttar sang the song "Dil Nu" for the Punjabi romcom Oh My Pyo.

Maninder Buttar has also been noted for his collaboration with numerous other Indian musicians, including the likes of Raftaar in the song Gall Goriye, and Ammy Virk. In 2019, Spotify included Buttar in the list of the most popular artists in Punjab, along Sidhu Moose Wala and Karan Aujla.<ref>{{cite news |last1=IANS |title=Spotify reveals Delhis music trends for 2019 |url=https://www.outlookindia.com/newsscroll/spotify-reveals-delhis-music-trends-for-2019/1687489 |accessdate=10 April 2020 |work=Outlook |date=17 December 2019}}</ref> In July 2020, he announced his debut studio album #Jugni'', and first track "Teri Meri Ladayi" from the album was released in August 2020. On April 1 , 2021 , he released second track from album named " Paani Di Gal " alongside Asees Kaur and on same day in evening he finally released full album "Jugni" on white Hill Music officially.

Discography

Studio albums

Singles

Songs in movies

References

Punjabi singers
Punjabi-language singers
Year of birth missing (living people)
Living people